Urvashi is an apsara (nymph) in Hindu legend.

Urvashi or Urvasi may also refer to:

People
 Urvashi (actress) (born 1967), Indian actress
 Urvashi Butalia (born 1952), Indian feminist and publisher
 Urvashi Chaudhary (born 1986), Indian actress and model
 Urvashi Dholakia (born 1979), Indian television actress
 Urvashi Rautela (born 1994), Indian Bollywood actress, model and beauty pageant titleholder
 Urvashi Sharma (born 1984), Indian Bollywood actress
 Urvashi Vaid (born 1958), Indian-American LGBT rights activist

Other uses
 Urvashi (film), a 1990 Indian Malayalam film
 Urvasi (song) of Kandhalan
 Urvashi (Yo Yo Honey Singh's song), a 2018 song by Yo Yo Honey Singh
Vikramōrvaśīyam (Vikram Urvashi), ancient Indian drama by Kalidasa about Urvashi